Youssef Ibrahim (born 2 March 1999 in Cairo) is an Egyptian professional squash player. As of July 2022, he was ranked 11 in the world.

Ibrahim currently studies at Princeton University and plays No. 1 for the men's squash team. He is set to graduate in 2022.

References

External links 

1999 births
Living people
Egyptian male squash players
Princeton Tigers men's squash players
21st-century Egyptian people